Nava Toran Temple is located at Khor, Jawad census town, under Jawad tehsil in Neemuch district, Madhya Pradesh, India. It is an eleventh-century temple which consists of ten decorative arches arranged in two rows. The temple decorations include leaf-shaped borders, heads of makaras, and garland bearers, Nav or nou means "nine" and toran means "pillars"; this is where the temple gets its name. The prime deity of the temple is Varaha, who is the third avatar of lord Vishnu. It is said that there is a tunnel beneath the temple that goes to the Chittor Fort and that Maharana Pratap often used to go through the tunnel to worship the deity of the temple.

Temples in Madhya Pradesh